= Sohala Na Mohra =

- Town
- Location within Pakistan
- Coordinates: 33.30°N 73.15°E
- Country: Pakistan
- Province: Islamabad C.T
- Elevation: 500 m (1,600 ft)
- Time zone: UTC+5 (PST)

Sohala Na Mohra is a town in the Islamabad Capital Territory of Pakistan. It is located at 33° 30' 0N 73° 15' 15E with an altitude of 500 metres (1643 feet).
